Broadoak School is a coeducational secondary school with academy status located in Partington in the English county of Greater Manchester.

Previously a foundation school administered by Trafford Metropolitan Borough Council, Broadoak School converted to academy status on 1 May 2012. The school now forms part of The Dean Trust which also includes Ashton-on-Mersey School in Sale, Forest Gate Academy in Partington and Lord Derby Academy in Huyton.

Broadoak School has a non-selective intake, and offers GCSEs and BTECs as programmes of study for pupils.

References

External links
Broadoak School official website
The Dean Trust

Secondary schools in Trafford
Academies in Trafford